Bradley Schafferius (born 4 September 1960) is an Australian sailor. He competed in the Tornado event at the 1988 Summer Olympics.

References

External links
 

1960 births
Living people
Australian male sailors (sport)
Olympic sailors of Australia
Sailors at the 1988 Summer Olympics – Tornado
Place of birth missing (living people)
20th-century Australian people